Bačka Palanka is a town and municipality located in the South Bačka District of the autonomous province of Vojvodina, Serbia. It is situated on the left bank of the Danube. In 2011 the town had a total population of 28,239, while Bačka Palanka municipality had 55,528 inhabitants.

Name 
In Serbian, the town is known as Бачка Паланка or Bačka Palanka, in Slovak as Báčska Palanka, in Croatian as Bačka Palanka, in Hungarian as Bácspalánka, in German as Plankenburg and in Turkish as Küçük Hisar.

Its name means "a town in Bačka" in Serbian. The word "palanka" itself originates from Turkish language. This word was also adopted by Serbs and it is used in the Serbian language with the same meaning. Older Serbian names for this town were Palanka (Паланка), Stara Palanka (Стара Паланка), Nova Palanka (Нова Паланка) and Nemačka Palanka (Немачка Паланка).

History 
Archeologists have proved that people have lived in the area for centuries. There are many archaeological objects from the Stone Age, Bronze Age, Iron Age and Roman period.

In the 11th century, this area was populated by Hungarians and Serbs. Bačka Palanka is first mentioned as a settlement in 1486, as a suburb of Ilok called Iločka. Until the 16th century, this area was administered by the Kingdom of Hungary.

At the beginning of the 16th century, the village was the property of a landowner Laurence of Ilok, a duke of Syrmia. It was destroyed by the Ottomans after The Battle of Mohács in 1526, but was then rebuilt as a small Ottoman fortress named Palanka. During the Ottoman administration (16th-17th century), Palanka was mostly populated by ethnic Serbs.

In 1687 Palanka was absorbed into the Habsburg monarchy and more Orthodox Serbs settled here. Palanka was then mentioned as a small town with 167 houses, all of which were Serb (1720 census data). Later, Germans, Slovaks and Hungarians settled here as well.

It was part of the Habsburg Military Frontier from 1702 to 1744. Nova Palanka (New Palanka) was founded between 1765 and 1770, 2 kilometers away from the original Palanka (which then became known as Stara Palanka - Old Palanka) and Nemačka Palanka (German Palanka) was founded by Danube Germans in 1783. Those three towns became one city, Bačka Palanka, in the 20th century.

Palanka's industrial development started in 1765, when a brick plant was built. It got its first post office in 1828. In 1875, one of the first libraries in Vojvodina was opened. In 1884 the Sintelon company was founded. In 1886, the first state school started functioning. By the year of 1894, a railway was built from Bačka Palanka to Feketić and a first phone call was made to Novi Sad.

In the second half of the 19th century, the German population became more numerous than the Serbian. According to the 1910 census, the population of Stara Palanka was mostly Serb, while populations of Nova Palanka and Nemačka Palanka were mostly German.

The city was under Habsburg administration until 1918, when it became part of the Kingdom of Serbs, Croats and Slovenes (later renamed as Yugoslavia). During the World War II (from 1941 to 1944), it was under Axis (Horty Hungary) occupation. In 1944, one part of Bačka Palanka's citizens of German ethnicity left the city, together with the defeated German army. As a consequence of the war, the site of a post-World War II work camp for the remaining ethnic Germans (Donauschwaben) was formed here under a new communist administration. After the work camps were dissolved (in 1948), the remaining German population was expelled from Yugoslavia. To replace the Germans, 3,609 (mostly Serb) colonists were settled in the town after World War II. Most of them originated from Bosnia and Herzegovina.

During the 1990s, about 5,000 refugees from Croatia and Bosnia moved to Bačka Palanka because of the Yugoslav wars. During the NATO bombing in 1999, Bačka Palanka was bombed by NATO twice, on 2 and 27 April. On both occasions the target was the Ilok–Bačka Palanka Bridge. It was only damaged, but not destroyed.

In 2002, 4 tons of fish stew were cooked at Kaloš Čarda at the Bager Lake in Bačka Palanka and it entered the Guinness Book of Records.

Inhabited places 

The Bačka Palanka municipality includes the city of Bačka Palanka and several villages.

Villages on the northern bank of the river Danube, in the region of Bačka:
 Gajdobra
 Despotovo
 Karađorđevo
 Mladenovo
 Nova Gajdobra
 Obrovac
 Parage
 Pivnice
 Silbaš
 Tovariševo
 Čelarevo

Villages on the southern bank of the river Danube, in the region of Syrmia:
 Neštin
 Vizić

Demographics

According to the last official census done in 2011, the municipality of Bačka Palanka has 55,528 inhabitants.

Ethnic composition of the town and municipality:

Tourism 
Tourism is developed in Bačka Palanka. The city is famous for Tikvara, a Natural Monument. Tikvara is a Danube lake. The Tikvara Resort complex is built along the lake for practicing various sports, recreational and entertaining activities. There are 33 archeological sites in the municipality. It is also known for Karađorđevo, which has a hunting ground and horse farm. People enjoy racing derbies in Karađorđevo. At the time of Serbia's emancipation, engraver Marko Vujatović worked on the intricate iconostasis of the Serbian Orthodox Church of St. John the Baptist. Bačka Palanka's Serbian church is one of the oldest churches in Vojvodina some built on foundations of temples of even earlier times. The north of the town is the Bagremara forest.

Economy and industry
Industry in Bačka Palanka started developing in the 18th century. The first companies were built in the second half of the 18th century. A brick plant was opened in 1765, and a tobacco storehouse was opened a year later. In 1974 the Bridge of Youth was built to connect Bačka Palanka and Ilok in Croatia. Today, Bačka Palanka falls among the ten most developed municipalities in Vojvodina. Bačka Palanka municipality is an agricultural and industrial center. The main industries are food, metallurgy, textiles, electronic and machine industry. The most famous factories are Enia, Sintelon, Tarkett, Nectar, Dunavprevoz, AD Bačka, Carlsberg, Marina, Majevica, Plattner, Žitoprodukt, Budućnost and others.

The following table gives a preview of total number of registered people employed in legal entities per their core activity (as of 2018):

Sports 
 
Sport is very popular in Bačka Palanka. People enjoy swimming in Lake Tikvara and cycling down the banks of The Danube. Sports include handball, football (soccer), basketball and karate. There is a chess tournament every year, Bačka Palanka Open.

The most famous sport clubs in Bačka Palanka are:
 FK Bačka, the most popular and most successful football (soccer) club in the municipality, and the second division club's longest trail in northern Serbia after the football club Spartak Subotica, Proleter Zrenjanin and Novi Sad.
 Stari Grad, football (soccer) club
 Krila Krajine, football (soccer) club
 Čsk Pivara, football (soccer) club in Čelarevo
 Sintelon, handball club
 Nopal, women's handball club
 Sintelon, kayak club
 Bačka Palanka, basketball club
 Bačka Palanka, table tennis club

Politics

List of town mayors
 Zvezdan Kisić (Socialist Party of Serbia)
 Dragan Bozalo (Serbian Radical Party) (2004–08)
 Kosta Stakić (Democratic Party) (2008–10)
 Dragan Bozalo (Serbian Radical Party) (2010–12)
 Bojan Radman (Socialist Party of Serbia) (2012–13)
 Aleksandar Đedovac (Serbian Progressive Party) (2013–16)
 Branislav Šušnica (Serbian Progressive Party (2016–)

Municipal parliament
Seats in the municipality parliament won in the 2004 local elections:
Serbian Radical Party (16)
Democratic Party (9)
Socialist Party of Serbia (6)
Democratic Party of Serbia (4)
Strength of Serbia Movement (3)
Serbian Renewal Movement (2)
Group of citizens "Club of Pivnice citizens" (2)

Seats in the municipality parliament after 2008 elections:
 SRS (18)
 DS (13)
 SPS (4)
 DSS (4)
 G17 (3)
 PSS
 SNP

Famous people 
 Alex Andjelic, ice hockey player and coach.
 Antal Benda (1910-1997), a Hungarian field handball player who competed in the 1936 Summer Olympics. Born in Bačka Palanka.
 Branislav Lončar, a Serbian sport shooter, European champion
 Franz Eisenhut (1857-1903), a Danube Swabian Orientalist and Realist painter. Born in Bačka Palanka.
 Milan Janić (1957–2003), a sprint canoeist, Olympic silver medalist and World champion. Born in Bačka Palanka.
 Natasa Dusev-Janics, a Hungarian canoeist, six-time Olympic medalist. Born in 1982 in Bačka Palanka.
 Zvezdan Jovanović, also known as Zveki and Zmija (Viper) assassinated former Serbian Prime Minister Zoran Đinđić on 12 March 2003.
 Mihalj Kertes, director of Federal Customs Bureau of Federal Republic of Yugoslavia, a close associate and man of trust of Slobodan Milošević.
 Kalman Konrad (1896–1980), one of the best football players in the Kingdom of Hungary in the 1910s. Born in Bačka Palanka.
 Nikola Krstić, that earned the title of honorary citizen of this town, even though he originated from Belgrade.
 Milan Kurepa (1933–2000), a renowned Serbian atomic physicist. Born in Bačka Palanka.
 Milan Mačvan, Serbian basketball player, Olympic silver medalist
 Aleksandar Petrović (Aca Seltik), singer of the band "Orthodox Celts" from Belgrade.
 Đorđe Stojaković, Serbian revolutionary, active in the Revolutions of 1848.
 Dragan Sudžum, handball player.
 Žarko Šešum, handball player, silver medalist at the European championships. 
 Marko Vujin, handball player, silver medalist at the European championships. 
 Dragan Zorić, a Serbian flatwater canoer and current (2006) world champion. Born in 1979 in Bačka Palanka.
 Bojan Beljanski, handball player, silver medalist at the European championships.
 Miljana Knezevic, a Serbian flatwater canoer. 3rd place (2007) in World championship and 3rd place (2008) in European championship.

International relations

Twin towns – sister cities
Bačka Palanka is twinned with:
 Otradny, Russia
 Kalush, Ukraine
 Liptovský Mikuláš, Slovakia

See also
 South Bačka District
 Bačka
 List of places in Serbia
 List of cities, towns and villages in Vojvodina

References
Bibliography
 Slobodan Ćurčić, Broj stanovnika Vojvodine, Novi Sad, 1996.
Notes

External links

 Bačka Palanka Online
 Bačka Palanka INFO
 Business directory of Bačka Palanka 
 Danube-town Fun-Forum of the city Bačka Palanka
 Tourist organization of the municipality Bačka Palanka
 Sports and Recreation Center and Nature Park Bačka Palanka

 
Places in Bačka
Populated places in Vojvodina
Populated places on the Danube
Municipalities and cities of Vojvodina
South Bačka District
Towns in Serbia